Jorairátar is a village of the Southern Alpujarras in the autonomous community of Andalusia, Spain. It is located within the municipality of Ugíjar in the Province of Granada.

Geography of Andalusia